Hampus Lindholm (born 20 January 1994) is a Swedish professional ice hockey defenceman for the Boston Bruins of the National Hockey League (NHL). Lindholm began his ice hockey career with Jonstorps IF and previously played with Rögle BK. He then played with the Anaheim Ducks for his first eight seasons in the NHL, before being dealt to Boston.

Playing career

Amateur
In 2009–10, Lindholm played for the Jonstorps U20 team, scoring three points (one goal and two assists) in three games. The following year, he played 39 games for Rögle BK U20, providing four assists.

Professional
In 2011–12, Lindholm began his professional career with Rögle, playing 20 games and scoring four points, Lindholm was also named the U20 Super Elit League's Best Defenseman. Lindholm was a top prospect who was ranked fourth among European skaters by the NHL Central Scouting Bureau, and he was selected sixth overall in the 2012 NHL Entry Draft by the Anaheim Ducks. He was considered by some to be a sleeper pick for the draft, with Rob Brodie comparing Lindholm to Erik Karlsson and Mika Zibanejad, two other Swedish prospects who rose sharply in the Draft.

Anaheim Ducks
Lindhom made his North American debut with the Norfolk Admirals, the Ducks' former American Hockey League (AHL) affiliate, in 2012–13. That year, he played 44 games, getting 11 points (one goal and ten assists).

Lindholm scored his first NHL goal on 6 November 2013, against Mike Smith of the Phoenix Coyotes.

After proving himself as one of Anaheim's top defensemen, Lindholm signed a six-year $31.5M contract on 27 October 2016.

Boston Bruins
In the final year of his contract and set to become an unrestricted free agent, trade rumors on Lindholm were increasing. On 19 March 2022, he was traded to the Boston Bruins for a 2022 first round pick, a 2023 second round pick, a 2024 second round pick, Urho Vaakanainen and John Moore. On 20 March 2022, just after being acquired by Boston, Lindholm was signed to an eight-year, $52M contract extension.

International play

Lindholm has represented Sweden at the 2012 U18 World Junior Championship, winning the silver medal. In the 2012 J18 World Championships, he was voted one of the Swedish team's three most valuable players of the tournament. He also won the most valuable player award in the games against Finland and Switzerland.

Lindholm was not able to play for Sweden at the 2013 World Junior Ice Hockey Championships due to a concussion.

Playing style
Lindholm is a two-way defenceman who is good at passing the puck. His skating and hockey intelligence have also been admired.
Former NHL and Rögle BK defenseman Kenny Jönsson has influenced Lindholm, and Lindholm mentioned Nicklas Lidström and Scott Niedermayer as his other role models.

Career statistics

Regular season and playoffs

International

Awards and honors

References

External links
 

1994 births
Anaheim Ducks draft picks
Anaheim Ducks players
Boston Bruins players
HC Donbass draft picks
Living people
National Hockey League first-round draft picks
Norfolk Admirals players
Rögle BK players
Sportspeople from Helsingborg
Swedish ice hockey defencemen